Lithocarpus keningauensis is a tree in the beech family Fagaceae. It is named for Keningau District in Sabah, to which the species is native.

Description
The brown or reddish bark is scaly or fissured.

Distribution and habitat
Lithocarpus keningauensis is endemic to Borneo where it is known only from Sabah. Its habitat is forests up to  altitude.

References

keningauensis
Endemic flora of Borneo
Trees of Borneo
Flora of Sabah
Plants described in 1998
Flora of the Borneo lowland rain forests